La Nation, la Loi, le Roi (the Law, the King) was the national motto of France during the constitutional period of the French monarchy, and is an example of a tripartite motto – much like the popular revolutionary slogan; Liberté, égalité, fraternité.

The motto itself was featured on the French Constitution of 1791 – and also on the currency of the period.

References

 
French words and phrases
National mottos
French political catchphrases